Thailand Open may refer to one of several sporting tournaments:
Thailand Open (badminton)
Thailand Open (golf)
Thailand Open (ATP) – a defunct tournament for professional male tennis players
Thailand Open (Pattaya) (1991–2015) – a defunct tournament for professional female tennis players
Bangkok Open (2005–2007) – a defunct tournament for professional female tennis players
Hua Hin Championships (2019–present)  – a current tournament for professional female tennis players
Hua Hin Challenger (2015–2017)  – a defunct Challenge-level tournament for professional male and female tennis players

See also
Thailand Masters (snooker)